The Son of the Red Corsair (Italian: Il figlio del corsaro rosso) is a 1943 Italian historical adventure film directed by Marco Elter and starring Vittorio Sanipoli, Luisa Ferida and Memo Benassi. It is an adaptation of the 1908 novel The Son of the Red Corsair by Emilio Salgari.

It was shot at Cinecittà Studios in Rome. The film's sets were designed by the art director Gino Morici.

Cast
 Vittorio Sanipoli as Enrico di Ventimiglia 
 Luisa Ferida as Carmen 
 Memo Benassi as Il marchese di Montelimar 
 Loredana as Neala 
 Pina Renzi as Panchita 
 Aldo Silvani as Don Barrejo de la Tuelva 
 Idolo Tancredi as Un corsaro 
 Domenico Viglione Borghese as Un corsaro 
 Felice Minotti as Un corsaro

References

Bibliography 
 Goble, Alan. The Complete Index to Literary Sources in Film. Walter de Gruyter, 1999.

External links 
 
 The Son of the Red Corsair at Variety Distribution

1943 films
Italian historical adventure films
Italian black-and-white films
1940s Italian-language films
Films directed by Marco Elter
Films shot at Cinecittà Studios
Films set in the 17th century
1940s historical adventure films
Films based on The Corsairs of the Antilles
1940s Italian films